"Hold Me in Your Arms" is a song by Canadian rock band The Trews. It was the first single released from their third full-length studio album, No Time For Later. It premiered at the 2007 Grey Cup pre-game show and was immediately released on iTunes.

It spent 17 weeks on Muchmusic's Countdown, peaking at number 1 on April 3, 2008.

It won the "Best Hard Rock" song category at the 8th Annual Independent Music Awards.

The song was certified Gold in Digital Downloads in Canada in April 2010.

Chart positions

References

The Trews songs
2007 singles
2007 songs